Daniel Crevier (born 1947) is a Canadian entrepreneur and artificial intelligence and image processing researcher. He is also the author of AI: the Tumultuous History of the Search for Artificial Intelligence. In 1974 Crevier received a Ph.D. degree from Massachusetts Institute of Technology. In 1979 Crevier founded Coreco Imaging (COntractual REsearch COmpany), which was acquired by Dalsa in 2005.

Notes

1947 births
Living people
Canadian academics
Massachusetts Institute of Technology alumni